Thomas Cheeseman (1846–1923) was a New Zealand botanist.

Thomas Cheeseman may also refer to:

Thomas Cheseman (ca. 1488–1536 or later), English politician
Thomas Cheesman (cricketer) (1816–1874), English cricketer 
Tom Cheesman (born 1961), academic
Tom Cheeseman (born 1986), Welsh rugby union footballer 
Thomas Cheesman (clergyman), see Aston Tirrold
Thomas Cheesman (engraver) (1760–1834), British engraver